The 6th Independent Battery Wisconsin Light Artillery, nicknamed the "Buena Vista Artillery," was an artillery battery that served in the Union Army during the American Civil War.

Service
The 6th Independent Battery was mustered into service at Racine, Wisconsin, on October 2, 1861.

The battery was mustered out on July 3, 1865, at Madison, Wisconsin.

Total strength and casualties
The 6th Independent Battery initially recruited 157 officers and men.  An additional 85 men were recruited as replacements, for a total of 242
men.

The battery suffered 1 officer and 6 enlisted men killed in action or died of wounds and 22 enlisted men who died of disease, for a total of 29 fatalities.

Commanders
 Captain Henry Dillon
 Captain Thomas R. Hood

See also

 List of Wisconsin Civil War units
 Wisconsin in the American Civil War

Notes

References
The Civil War Archive

Military units and formations established in 1861
Military units and formations disestablished in 1865
Units and formations of the Union Army from Wisconsin
Wisconsin
1861 establishments in Wisconsin